Porter Creek North is an electoral district which returns a member (known as an MLA) to the Legislative Assembly of Yukon, Canada. It contains part of the Whitehorse subdivision of Porter Creek, as well as the subdivisions of Crestview and Kulan. It is bordered by the Whitehorse ridings of Porter Creek Centre, Porter Creek South, Takhini-Kopper King, and Riverdale North, as well as the rural ridings of Lake Laberge and Kluane.

The electoral district was known as Whitehorse Porter Creek East before 1992.

The district at various points has been held by Yukon Conservative Senator Dan Lang, former Premier John Ostashek, former Whitehorse City Councillor Doug Graham, and former Yukon Commissioner Geraldine Van Bibber.

MLAs
Whitehorse Porter Creek East

Porter Creek North

Election results

2021 general election

2016 general election

|-

 

|-
! align=left colspan=3|Total
! align=right| 989
! align=right| 100.0%
! align=right| –

2011 general election

|-

|-
! align=left colspan=3|Total
! align=right| 811
! align=right| 100.0%
! align=right| –

2006 general election

|-

|-

| Liberal
| Dale Cheeseman
| align="right"| 191
| align="right"| 28.9%
| align="right"| +8.7%
|-

| NDP
| Dave Hobbis
| align="right"| 158
| align="right"| 23.9%
| align="right"| +5.7%
|-
! align=left colspan=3|Total
! align=right| 661
! align=right| 100.0%
! align=right| –

2002 general election

|-

| Liberal
| Dave Austin
| align="right"| 148
| align="right"| 20.2%
| align="right"| -33.1%
|-

| NDP
| Mark Bowers
| align="right"| 135
| align="right"| 18.5%
| align="right"| 15.4%
|-

| Independent
| Roger Rondeau
| align="right"| 112
| align="right"| 15.3%
| align="right"| +3.2
|-
! align=left colspan=3|Total
! align=right| 731
! align=right| 100.0%
! align=right| –

2000 general election

| Liberal
| Don Roberts
| align="right"| 504
| align="right"| 53.3%
| align="right"| +14.1%

| NDP
| Sidney Maddison
| align="right"| 114
| align="right"| 12.1%
| align="right"| -7.4%
|-
! align=left colspan=3|Total
! align=right| 946
! align=right| 100.0%
! align=right| –

1996 general election

|-

| Liberal
| Don Roberts
| align="right"| 384
| align="right"| 39.2%
| align="right"| +25.4%
|-

| NDP
| Luigi Zanasi
| align="right"| 191
| align="right"| 19.5%
| align="right"| +13.8%
|-
! align=left colspan=3|Total
! align=right| 979
! align=right| 100.0%
! align=right| –

1992 general election

|-

| NDP
| Carl Rumscheidt
| align="right"| 301
| align="right"| 33.3%
| align="right"| –

| Liberal
| Eldon Organ
| align="right"| 125
| align="right"| 13.8%
| align="right"| –
|-
! align=left colspan=3|Total
! align=right| 904
! align=right| 100.0%
! align=right| –

References

Yukon territorial electoral districts
Politics of Whitehorse
1992 establishments in Yukon